The pectoral-patch cisticola (Cisticola brunnescens) is a species of bird in the family Cisticolidae. It is found in Cameroon, Republic of the Congo, Democratic Republic of the Congo, Eritrea, Ethiopia, Gabon, Kenya, Somalia and Tanzania. Its natural habitats are damp or wet areas in upland grassland.

Description

At 9–10 cm this is a small, streak-backed cisticola with short or medium tail, which may get longer in the breeding season. It differs from the pale-crowned cisticola in having a pale rufous (not buff) crown and forehead in the breeding season. The pectoral patches become darker in the breeding season, but even then they may not be easy to see.

Voice
The voice is stonechat-like in quality with harsh tssk tssk or szisk szisk notes given in display flight.

References

pectoral-patch cisticola
Birds of Central Africa
Birds of East Africa
pectoral-patch cisticola
Taxa named by Theodor von Heuglin
Taxonomy articles created by Polbot